The Akwa Ibom State Peoples Democratic Party, based in Uyo is the official state level chapter of the Peoples
Democratic Party (PDP) in Akwa Ibom State. It is headed by chairman Rt. Hon Elder Aniekan Akpan, who was elected to lead the state party.

Current elected officials

Members of the Senate (2015 - 2019)

Members of the Senate (2019 - 2023)

Members of the House of Representatives 2015-2019

Members of the House of Assembly 2015-2019

Executive Board
 Chairman: Rt. Hon (Elder) Aniekan Akpan
 Deputy Chairman: Hon Lawrence Udosen 
 1st Vice-Chair: Ibanga Brownson
 2nd Vice-Chair: Hon. Godwin Okponung
 3rd Vice-Chair: Pastor Cletus Eshiet
 Secretary: Hon. Harrison Ekpo
 1st Assistant Secretary: Mrs Useneno Tom
 2nd Assistant Secretary: Mrs Ekaette Inok Collins
 3rd Assistant Secretary: Hon. Selina Isotok
 Treasurer: Pastor Joyce Udoh
 Financial Secretary: Hon Mfon Nkanteen 
 Assistant Financial Secretary: Hon. Saviour Inyang
 Organizing Secretary: Barr Moses Akpan
 1st Assistant Organizing Secretary: Hon. Enobong Harry
 2nd Assistant Organizing Secretary: Brendan Archibong Etokidem
 3rd Assistant Organizing Secretary: Hon. Effiong Ebong
 Publicity Secretary: Borono Bassey
 Assistant Publicity Secretary: Mr Itoro Noah
 Auditor: Ibanga Udofia
 Legal Adviser: Barr Akpadiaha Ebitu
 Assistant Legal Adviser: David Amah
 Woman Leader: Meme Offiong Akpabio
 1st Woman Leader: Grace Ekpe
 2nd Woman Leader: Emem Ottonsek Etim Edet
 3rd Woman Leader: Abigail Akpan
 Youth Leader: Efremfon Effiong Umoh
 Ex-Officio: Mrs Aniedi Inyang
 Ex-Officio: Mmeyene Archibong
 Ex-Officio: Mary Unungene
 Ex-Officio: Catherine Asian
 Ex-Officio: Mfon Okon Udoima

List of chairpersons

References

Politics of Akwa Ibom State
Peoples Democratic Party (Nigeria) by state